Daghdar (also Romanized as Dāghdār and Dāqdār) is a village in Qara Bashlu Rural District, Chapeshlu District, Dargaz County, Razavi Khorasan Province, Iran. At the 2006 census, its population was 570, in 130 families.

References 

Populated places in Dargaz County